She'd Give Anything is the first EP by American country music band Boy Howdy. It was released in 1994 by Curb Records. It peaked at #19 on the Top Country Albums chart. The EP includes the singles "She'd Give Anything" and "They Don't Make 'em Like That Anymore", which respectively reached #4 and #2 on Billboard Hot Country Singles & Tracks (now Hot Country Songs). Also included is "A Cowboy's Born with a Broken Heart", previously a single from their 1992 debut album Welcome to Howdywood.

Track listing

Personnel
As listed in liner notes

Boy Howdy
Cary Park - acoustic guitar, electric guitar, fiddle, mandolin, background vocals  
Larry Park - acoustic guitar, electric guitar, background vocals
Jeffrey Steele - bass guitar, lead vocals, background vocals
Hugh Wright - drums, congas, percussion

Additional musicians
Chris Farren - acoustic guitar, piano on "A Cowboy's Born with a Broken Heart", background vocals
John Hobbs - piano
Jay Dee Maness - steel guitar
Kevin Nadeau - organ
Scott Saturday - background vocals

Chart performance

References
[ She'd Give Anything] at Allmusic

1994 EPs
Boy Howdy albums
Curb Records EPs
Albums produced by Chris Farren (country musician)